Samal, officially the Island Garden City of Samal (IGaCOS;) is a 4th class component city in the province of Davao del Norte, Philippines. According to the 2020 census, it has a population of 116,771 people.

It is made up of Samal Island and the smaller Talikud Island in Davao Gulf, from the merger of former municipalities of Samal, Babak, and Kaputian.

Samal is a part of the Metropolitan Davao area and is two kilometers away from Davao City, the largest city and the primary economic center of Mindanao.

Etymology

The name Samal was derived from the Sama-Bajau peoples, the natives who were the first inhabitants of the island. The first datu in the island was Datu Taganiyug, a native of what is now Peñaplata, today the governance center of the city. In the past, the people of the island name a place about what was the said place known for. For example, the name Peñaplata is said to be derived from the word "piña" or pineapple because of the abundance of pineapple in the area; this, however, is folk etymology, for peñaplata literally means "rock of silver" in Spanish. Tagpopongan is the first barangay in the island which name was from the word "tagpo" or meet. It was so called owing to the fact that this place was chosen by the datus as their meeting place. The word Samal was also known before because it was commonly used as surname by dat

History

Early Beginnings
The island was initially home to the Sama-Bajau peoples. Later on, Spain managed to conquer the island in the late 1840s when Nueva Vergara (Davao City today) was established.

World War 2
The Pacific War, which happened during World War II, struck the island. Japanese fighter planes bombed the island. Japanese forces occupied the island and forced the people to work for four years until they were expelled by the Allied forces. After the war, infrastructure was built, such as schools, churches and stores in the area.

Official founding of the municipality
The time came on July 8, 1948, when the entire island itself becomes part of the newly created municipality of Samal; it was the official founding of the municipality. Five years later in 1953, the municipality of Babak was created from Samal, marking the political division of the island between the two municipalities. The island experienced further political division when the municipality of Kaputian was created from the island in 1966. During this period, the standard of living in these three municipalities became low and extremely rural.

Proposed province
In 1969, a proposal to create the sub-province of Samal was created by Republic Act No. 5999 and covered the area of the present-day city. The act was enacted without President Ferdinand Marcos' approval. However, the sub-province was never inaugurated.

Cityhood

The city was created through Republic Act No. 8471 on January 30, 1998. This act paved the way for the dissolution and merger of the three former municipalities of Samal, Babak, and Kaputian into one local government unit by turning then into districts, now officially named as IGaCoS, the Island Garden City of Samal. The first city mayor was Rogelio P. Antalan, who later served for three consecutive terms from 1998 to 2007.

Hostage crisis
On September 22, 2015, Kjartan Sekkingstad, aged 55, from Sotra, Norway, was abducted by Abu Sayyaf Islamist guerrillas from a high-end tourist resort on Samal Island, along with two Canadian men, John Ridsdel, aged 68, and Robert Hall, aged 67, and a Filipina woman, Marites Flor, Hall's girlfriend. In April and June 2016, the Canadians were beheaded after ransoms were not paid, and in June 2016 Flor was released. On September 17, 2016, Sekkingstad was released on Jolo island, 600 miles south of Manila after captor Abu Sayyaf received $638,000 in ransom for his release. He was handed over to another rebel group, the Moro National Liberation Front. The MNLF was in peace talks with the government and had been working with authorities to secure Sekkingstad's release. It is not known who paid the ransom for Sekkingstad, but it was not the Norwegian government.

Geography
Samal is the only city in the country that encompasses two entire islands, hence its name as the Island Garden City. While pristine beaches dot the island's shores, hills dominate the middle portions of the island. Talikud Island is located southwest of the main island.

IGaCoS enjoys an evenly distributed rainfall throughout the year and a typhoon-free climate, which makes it ideal for agricultural production.

Climate

Barangays
Samal is politically subdivided into 46 barangays. In 1955, the sitios of Mambago, San Isidro, Santo Niño, San Antonio, San Agustin, Dangcaan, Balet, Tambo, Camudmud, and Cogon were converted into barrios of the now-defunct municipality of Babak.

Demographics

Cebuano is the medium of language of the people of Samal Island, followed by Isama, Boholano and Tausug.

Economy

Agriculture
The city's economy depends greatly in its agricultural production. Copra, mango, corn, vegetables, citrus and fish are the major products of the island. Livestock production is also a major product with Davao City as the primary market. In addition, rice is also produced in the barangays of Libuak in Babak District and Aumbay in Peñaplata District.

Tourism

The city is the largest resort city in the country. It has good beaches and houses many beach resorts. It has also numerous marine reefs and tranquil waters that lure the tourists to visit them, especially in Talikud Island. There are 34 registered resorts with a combined capacity of 1,000 rooms in the city. The most popular of these is the Pearl Farm Beach Resort, owned by Ms. Universe 1973 winner Margarita Moran. Because of these, the Department of Tourism named it one of the best visiting islands in Mindanao and currently one of the fastest growing tourist destinations in the country. Thus, tourism is the main source of income in the city. Biggest taxes are imposed to tourism and resort industry.

There are three main festivals held annually in the city, namely: 
Kabasan Festival, coincides with the founding of Babak municipality every year in May, features bikini open contests, fireworks display, street-dancing and street parties, and motocross events
White Nights Festival, takes place every two days with Kaputian as the venue, celebrating the city's cultural and historical heritage; and
Hugyaw Madayaw Festival, a spin-off of Davao's Kadayawan Festival which is also held annually in August, and also an attempt to preserve the diminishing Sama culture in the island.

Monfort Bat Sanctuary, the world's largest fruit bat colony, is also located in the island.

Fishing
Fishing is also a growing business sector in this city, since the city was situated on the island, it cannot fully complement the demand for meat products imported from other parts of the country, especially in nearby Davao City. The city has no both container port and deep-water transport terminal, except for a barge wharf at Babak district, to deliver market products directly to the city, so the city government advocated building fishery complexes across the city to minimize the demand for market products imported to the city. Fish, pearls, and edible crustaceans such as shrimps, prawns, and crabs are the main aquatic consumable products in the city.

Government
The center of city governance is located at Barangay Peñaplata, Samal District, situated at the west central coast of the island. The city has three districts: Babak, Samal and Kaputian. These districts used to serve as separate towns until the 1998 city merger.

Transportation

Barge/ferry service or passenger boats from the Sasa Wharf & Santa Ana Wharf in Davao City serves the island city. The modes of transportation on the island are motorcycles, tricycles or trikes, and bus and private car services offered by resorts.

Bus operators:
Island City Express (operated by Mindanao Star) daily route to Kaputian, Babak, Peñaplata from Davao City (via Kinawitnon ferry port).

Sister cities

Local
  Las Piñas, Philippines

See also 
International Seaport of Davao

References

External links

 Samal Profile at the DTI Cities and Municipalities Competitive Index
 [ Philippine Standard Geographic Code]
 Local Governance Performance Management System
 
 Samal Island Guide

Cities in Davao del Norte
Planned cities in the Philippines
Populated places established in 1948
1948 establishments in the Philippines
Island cities in the Philippines
Component cities in the Philippines
Establishments by Philippine executive order